Klemens "Klimek" Bachleda (13 November 1851 - 6 August 1910) was a pioneering Polish mountain guide and mountain rescuer in Austria-Hungary. He died during an unsuccessful mountain rescue attempt in the High Tatras.

Biography

Early and personal life
The name of Bachleda's father is unknown. His mother was Zofia Bachleda Galian. He was a Goral, an ethnographic group which inhabits the Tatra Mountains on both sides of the modern border between Poland and Slovakia. She died when he was twelve, leaving him an orphan.

He earned a living as a shepherd-boy in the high mountains. He later went to Upper Hungary to find work, where he was called up for military service. In 1873, he was discharged, and returned to Zakopane. It was in the grip of a cholera epidemic, and he tended the sick and buried the dead. Thereafter, he supported himself by working as a carpenter, and also by hunting.

He married Agnieszka Styrczula from Dzianisz, and they had three children. She died, and he remarried.

Mountain guide
During the late 19th century, mountaineering became a popular pastime for young people from the middle and upper classes across Europe. Men with local knowledge were in demand as guides, and could be well paid.

In 1886, he was recognised as a Class I guide. In 1898, Jędrzej Wala the younger retired. From then on, Bachleda was called Królem Przewodników Tatrzańskich ('King of the Tatra Guides') and Orzeł Tatr ('Eagle of the Tatras'). He is said to have had outstanding qualities of character: tact, minimisation of risk, courage, consideration, self-sacrifice, helpfulness, diligence and honesty.

His clients included: Tadeusz Boy-Żeleński (1874-1941, writer, poet, critic and translator),  (1878-1968, mechanical engineer and mathematician),  (1862-1928, journalist and translator),  (1869-1935, physician, painter and folklorist),  (1873-1942, merchant),  (1861-1956, priest),  (1867-1941, writer and publisher), Mieczysław Karłowicz (1876-1909, composer and conductor), Franciszek Nowicki (1864-1935, poet and political activist),  (1861-1907, historian), Kazimierz Przerwa-Tetmajer (1865-1940, poet and novelist) and Henryk Sienkiewicz (1846-1916, journalist, novelist and Nobel laureate).

He had a talent for orienting himself in difficult, rocky areas, and for mountaineering. He pioneered several routes in the Tatras. He climbed in groups roped together from as early as 1900. He was the first Tatra highlander to learn to ski (no later than 1902).

In 1903, the recently founded  ('Tourist Section of the Tatra Society') rewarded him for discovering a new pass through the main ridge of the Tatras, namely .

Mountain rescuer
In 1909, Mariusz Zaruski (1867–1941, Polish soldier and sportsman) founded Tatrzańskie Ochotnicze Pogotowie Ratunkowe (TOPR, 'Tatra Volunteer Search and Rescue'). Bachleda became his deputy, and one of its most active and dedicated members.

They fell, and Szulakiewicz suffered serious injuries. Jarzyna managed to descend and to seek help. Zaruski organised a rescue party. Conditions were atrocious: a violent thunderstorm, and heavy rain mixed with snow and hail. Zaruski ordered a halt because of the risk to life. Bachleda unroped himself, and continued on alone. He did not return.

On 7 August, a second unsuccessful attempt was made to rescue Szulakiewicz.

On 8 August, a third attempt reached Szulakiewicz. He had died, probably on the night of 6–7 August, from injuries and exposure. The weather worsened, and the five-strong rescue party was trapped on the mountain overnight. They brought the body down on 9 August.

Bachleda's comrades hoped that he had found another way down. Rain, wind and fog hampered their searches. On 13 August, their worst fears were confirmed: they found his body. On 15 August, they began to bring him down. His gravestone bears the Polish-language inscription, Poświęcił się i zginął ('He sacrificed himself and died'). He was the first member of TOPR to die during a rescue attempt.

There is a detailed account of the double tragedy on the TOPR website.

Legacy
Ulica Klimka Bachledy ('Klimek Bachleda Street') in Zakopane is named after him.

Księga Tatr ('The Book of the Tatra', 1955) by Jalu Kurek (1904-1983, poet and writer) is a novelised account of Bachleda's life. In 1959, the play Klimek Bachleda (Orzeł Tatr) ('Klimek Bachleda (Eagle of the Tatras)') by Julian Reimschüssel (1908-1984, teacher and writer) was performed in Zakopane.

Gallery

Footnotes

References

External links
 

1851 births
1910 deaths
Mountain guides
Mountain rescue
Mountaineering deaths
People from Zakopane
Polish Gorals
Polish male ski mountaineers
Polish mountain climbers